The Niels Nielsen Fourteen-Side Barn Farm near Noonan, North Dakota, United States, is a round barn that was built in 1914 by successful Danish immigrant Niels Nielsen.  It was built from a kit purchased from the Chicago House Wrecking Company.  It was listed on the National Register of Historic Places in 1986.

The barn "is an important representative of the round barn theme because it illustrates the popularity of pre-cut kits sometimes used in their
construction."

See also 
 Ault–Weygandt Farm: another Chicago House Wrecking Company kit building

References

Barns on the National Register of Historic Places in North Dakota
Danish-American culture in North Dakota
Farms on the National Register of Historic Places in North Dakota
Infrastructure completed in 1914
Round barns in North Dakota
National Register of Historic Places in Divide County, North Dakota